Nathan Nicholas Gilchrist (born 11 June 2000) is a professional cricketer who plays for Kent County Cricket Club.

Gilchrist was born at Harare in Zimbabwe in 2000 and grew up in South Africa. His father is English and he holds a British passport, allowing him to play domestic cricket as an English player. After being  educated at St Stithians College in Johannesburg, Gilchrist moved to England in 2016 to attend King's College, Taunton, initially on a three-month cricket exchange programme from St Stithians. He joined the Somerset County Cricket Club academy system and first played Second XI cricket for the side in 2016 before signing a professional contract with the club after leaving school in 2018. In August 2020 he joined Kent, initially on loan for the remainder of the 2020 season with a three-year contract which began in November 2020.

Gilchrist made his first-class cricket debut for Kent on 22 August 2020, playing in a 2020 Bob Willis Trophy match against Surrey at The Oval, and his List A cricket debut on 28 July 2021 against Lancashire in the 2021 Royal London One-Day Cup.

On 1 May 2022, after being dismissed for a pair in a County Championship match at Headingley, Gilchrist equalled the record of six consecutive ducks in first-class cricket.

References

External links

2000 births
Living people
English cricketers
Somerset cricketers
Kent cricketers
English cricketers of the 21st century
English people of Zimbabwean descent